The Village of St. Joseph  was founded on 28 April 1881 and is located in St. Joseph Township, Champaign County, Illinois, United States. The population was 3,810 at the 2020 census, down from 3,967 at the 2010 census.

Geography

Demographics

As of the 2020 census there were 3,810 people, 1,452 households, and 1,086 families residing in the village. The racial makeup of the village was 92.28% White, 0.45% African American, 0.26% Native American, 1.00% Asian, 1.15% from other races, and 4.86% from two or more races. Hispanic or Latino of any race were 3.02% of the population.

There were 1,452 households, out of which 79.61% had children under the age of 18 living with them, 50.76% were married couples living together, 22.93% had a female householder with no husband present, and 25.21% were non-families. 22.73% of all households were made up of individuals, and 15.56% had someone living alone who was 65 years of age or older. The average household size was 3.33 and the average family size was 2.78.

The village's age distribution consisted of 29.5% under the age of 18, 5.1% from 18 to 24, 24.3% from 25 to 44, 26.7% from 45 to 64, and 14.4% who were 65 years of age or older. The median age was 39.2 years. For every 100 females, there were 95.2 males. For every 100 females age 18 and over, there were 83.0 males.

The median income for a household in the village was $93,621, and the median income for a family was $105,526. Males had a median income of $56,065 versus $49,076 for females. The per capita income for the village was $35,292. About 2.5% of families and 5.2% of the population were below the poverty line, including 2.9% of those under age 18 and 16.3% of those age 65 or over.

Education
The public high school for this community is St. Joseph-Ogden High School, a school that combines students graduating from St. Joseph Middle School with students graduating from Prairieview-Ogden Junior High, with the majority of students coming from the St. Joseph area.  Not all students within Prairieview-Ogden Junior High's district are within the high school's district.  Some of these students will fall within the borders of Rantoul, IL or Thomasboro, IL high school districts instead.

Restaurants
There is a mix of chain restaurants and locally owned restaurants in St. Joseph. Chain restaurants include Monical's Pizza, Dairy Queen, Subway, and Casey's Pizza.  Locally owned restaurants include Padano's Pizza, Roch's Place, The Ribcage, The Wheelhouse, Scratch, and El Toro.  The grocery store, IGA, and the newest gas station, Jack Flash, also have fresh delis inside.

Notable people
 Frank Hanly, 26th Governor of Indiana, was born in St. Joseph.
Marianne Dickerson, a world class long distance runner, lived in St. Joseph.

References

External links
Village Home Page
Community Arts Resource
History of St. Joseph, Illinois
Champaign County Economic Development Corporation - St. Joseph Community Profile
St. Joseph-Ogden High School

Villages in Champaign County, Illinois
Villages in Illinois
Populated places established in 1881
1881 establishments in Illinois